Kuntoro Mangkusubroto  was Director-General (1993–97) and Minister (1998–99) in the Indonesian Department of Mines, before being appointed to head the Aceh-Nias Body for Rehabilitation and Reconstruction (BRR) following the devastating 2004 Indian Ocean earthquake and tsunami of December 26, 2004.

Education
Kuntoro was born on March 14, 1947, in Purwokerto, Central Java. After a first degree (1972) and the Bandung Institute of Technology (ITB), he did post-graduate work at Stanford University (Master of Civil Engineering, 1977) but returned to ITB for his doctorate (1982).

Career
While teaching at ITB from 1982, he began working in government from 1984, initially in the ministry of the State Secretariat. He gained a reputation for efficiency as CEO of government-owned coal and tin mines in 1984-89.

In 1993 he was appointed Director-General of General Mining, where he gained the respect of both foreign investors and government for efficiency and probity. This led to his appointment as Minister of Mining in the reforming cabinet of President B.J. Habibie in 1998-99.

In 2000 he was appointed CEO of the state-owned Electricity Company, PLN.

The 2004 Indian Ocean earthquake and tsunami in December 2004 was an unprecedented disaster for Indonesia, with some 200,000 dead or missing and a million homeless. It also witnessed record amounts of aid being promised for reconstruction of the affected regions of Aceh and Nias, both internationally and in Indonesia. President Susilo Bambang Yudhoyono controversially decided not to trust the existing government agencies to manage this huge effort, but appointed Kuntoro at Cabinet level to head a new agency to manage the flow of funds and the reconstruction, Badan Rehabilitasi dan Rekonstruksi Aceh-Nias, or BRR. The four years (2005-09)of BRR reconstruction witnessed an unprecedented flow of international and national personnel into a region that had been plagued by insurgency and isolation. The Helsinki peace agreement of 2005 meant that BRR had to work with both government and the former separatists of GAM. The two processes were transformative for Aceh. 

In October 2009, when BRR had completed its task, Kuntoro was appointed head of the Presidential Unit of Development Supervision and Control (familiarly called UKP4). UKP4 was officially dissolved by President Joko Widodo as of February 23, 2015, based on Presidential Regulation No. 26 of 2015 Article 40 paragraph B. Some of the functions of this institution are merged into the Cabinet Secretariat and the Office of the Presidential Staff.

References 

1947 births
People from Banyumas Regency
Indonesian politicians
Living people
Asia Game Changer Award winners